George Hammond (born 27 March 1976) is a South African cricketer. He played in three first-class and six List A matches for Border in 1997/98 and 1998/99.

See also
 List of Border representative cricketers

References

External links
 

1976 births
Living people
South African cricketers
Border cricketers
People from Vryburg